Muggio was a municipality in the district of Mendrisio in the canton of Ticino in Switzerland.  On 25 October 2009 the municipalities of Bruzella, Cabbio, Caneggio, Morbio Superiore, Muggio and Sagno merged into the municipality of Breggia.

History
Muggio is first mentioned in 852 as Mugio.

The valley has been inhabited since ancient times and by the 9th Century farmers had settled in the village.  It was included in the 1299 listing of land owned by Como Cathedral.  At that time it was part of the parish of Cabbio.  In 1673 it became a vice-parish, which was supported, until the 19th Century, by the mother church at Balerna.

The Church of San Lorenzo was first mentioned in 1578.  In 1760 it was rebuilt and it was renovated several times, most recently in 2003-04.

The inhabitants lived on agriculture and animal husbandry as well as emigration, especially of artists, to other countries.  Several large waves of emigration occurred between 1850 and 1940.  Since the 1950s the population has continued to decline.

Geography

Of this area,  or 8.2% is used for agricultural purposes, while  or 77.1% is forested.

Of the built up area, housing and buildings made up 1.2% and transportation infrastructure made up 0.5%.  Out of the forested land, 73.5% of the total land area is heavily forested and 3.6% is covered with orchards or small clusters of trees.  Of the agricultural land, 7.0% is used for growing crops and 1.2% is used for alpine pastures.  All the water in the village is flowing water.

The village is located in the Mendrisio district, on the floor of the Muggio valle. It consists of the village of Muggio and the hamlets of Scudellate and Roncapiano.

Coat of arms
The blazon of the municipal coat of arms is Argent a fess wavy argent between a maize cob or fesswise leaved vert and a bunch of grapes also or slipped and leaved also vert.  The wavy stripe symbolizes the river that flows through the valley, while the maize cob and grapes refer to local agriculture.

Demographics
Muggio has a population of 224.  Of the Swiss national languages, 8 speak German, 2 people speak French, 191 people speak Italian.  The remainder (5 people) speak another language.

In  there were 3 live births to Swiss citizens and were 10 deaths of Swiss citizens.  Ignoring immigration and emigration, the population of Swiss citizens decreased by 7 while the foreign population remained the same.  There were 2 Swiss men and 1 Swiss woman who immigrated back to Switzerland.  At the same time, there was 1 non-Swiss man who immigrated from another country to Switzerland.  The total Swiss population change in 2008 (from all sources, including moves across municipal borders) was a decrease of 3 and the non-Swiss population remained the same.  This represents a population growth rate of -1.4%.

 there were 142 single-family homes (or 82.1% of the total) out of a total of 173 inhabited buildings.  There were 28 multi-family buildings (16.2%), along with 2 multi-purpose buildings that were mostly used for housing (1.2%) and 1 other use buildings (commercial or industrial) that also had some housing (0.6%).  Of the single-family homes 5 were built before 1919, while 3 were built between 1990 and 2000.  The greatest number of single-family homes (103) were built between 1919 and 1945.

 there were 210 apartments in the village.  The most common apartment size was 4 rooms of which there were 69.  There were 8 single room apartments and 59 apartments with five or more rooms.  Of these apartments, a total of 101 apartments (48.1% of the total) were permanently occupied, while 108 apartments (51.4%) were seasonally occupied and 1 apartment (0.5%) was empty.

The historical population is given in the following chart:

Politics
In the 2007 federal election the most popular party was the CVP which received 39.77% of the vote.  The next three most popular parties were the FDP (22.03%), the SP (20.08%) and the Green Party (7.41%).  In the federal election, a total of 66 votes were cast, and the voter turnout was 32.0%.

In the  Gran Consiglio election, there were a total of 214 registered voters in Muggio, of which 116 or 54.2% voted.  2 blank ballots were cast, leaving 114 valid ballots in the election.  The most popular party was the PLRT which received 40 or 35.1% of the vote.  The next three most popular parties were; the PPD+GenGiova (with 31 or 27.2%), the PS (with 14 or 12.3%) and the LEGA (with 13 or 11.4%).

In the  Consiglio di Stato election,   The most popular party was the PLRT which received 38 or 32.8% of the vote.  The next three most popular parties were; the PPD (with 32 or 27.6%), the PS (with 15 or 12.9%) and the PS (with 15 or 12.9%).

Economy
There were 85 residents of the village who were employed in some capacity, of which females made up 32.9% of the workforce.   the total number of full-time equivalent jobs was 21. The number of jobs in the tertiary sector was 8. In the tertiary sector; 2 or 25.0% were in the movement and storage of goods, 2 or 25.0% were in a hotel or restaurant and 2 or 25.0% were technical professionals or scientists.

, there were 6 workers who commuted into the village and 65 workers who commuted away.  The village is a net exporter of workers, with about 10.8 workers leaving the village for every one entering.

Religion
There are 15 individuals (or about 7.28% of the population) who belong to another church (not listed on the census), and 21 individuals (or about 10.19% of the population) did not answer the question.

Education
, there were 20 students from Muggio who attended schools outside the village.

Famous people
 Pietro Perti, Baroque sculptor

References

Former municipalities of Ticino